Zabrus brevicollis is a species of ground beetle in the Pelor subgenus that is endemic to Greece.

References

Beetles described in 1857
Beetles of Europe
Endemic fauna of Greece
Zabrus
Taxa named by Hermann Rudolph Schaum